Knowltonia is a genus of the family Ranunculaceae. There are 25 species native to South Africa and Latin America. The juice from the stem of many of the species in the genus is a powerful vesicant.

Species include
IPNI accepts: the following species:

 Knowltonia anemonoides H.Rasm.
 Knowltonia assisbrasiliana (Kuhlm. & Porto) Christenh. & Byng
 Knowltonia balliana (Britton) Christenh. & Byng
 Knowltonia bracteata Harv. ex Zahlbr.
 Knowltonia brevistylis Szyszyl.
 Knowltonia caffra (Eckl. & Zeyh.) Christenh. & Byng ex Mosyakin & de Lange
 Knowltonia capensis (L.) Huth
 Knowltonia chilensis (Gay) Christenh. & Byng
 Knowltonia cordata H.Rasm.
 Knowltonia crassifolia (Hook.) Christenh. & Byng
 Knowltonia fanninii (Harv. ex Mast.) Christenh. & Byng
 Knowltonia filia (L.f.) T.Durand & Schinz
 Knowltonia helleborifolia (DC.) Christenh. & Byng
 Knowltonia hepaticifolia (Hook.) Christenh. & Byng
 Knowltonia hootae Christenh. & Byng
 Knowltonia integrifolia (DC.) Christenh. & Byng
 Knowltonia major (Phil.) Christenh. & Byng
 Knowltonia mexicana (Kunth) Christenh. & Byng
 Knowltonia moorei (Espinosa) Christenh. & Byng
 Knowltonia peruviana (Britton) Christenh. & Byng
 Knowltonia sellowii (Pritz.) Christenh. & Byng
 Knowltonia tenuifolia (L.f.) Mosyakin
 Knowltonia transvaalensis Szyszyl.
 Knowltonia vesicatoria (L.f.) Sims
 Knowltonia whyteana (Baker f.) Engl.

References

Ranunculaceae
Ranunculaceae genera